is a 1990 Japanese film directed by Shūsuke Kaneko. Actress Yuki Saito won the Best Actress award at the Yokohama Film Festival for her performance in this film.

References

1990 films
1990s Japanese-language films
Films directed by Shusuke Kaneko
Films scored by Shigeru Umebayashi
1990s Japanese films